The United States Air Force Scientific Advisory Board (SAB) is a Federal Advisory Committee that provides independent advice on matters of science and technology relating to the Air Force mission, reporting directly to the Secretary of the Air Force and Chief of Staff of the Air Force.  In the past, it has provided advice on technologies such as: supersonic aircraft, weather forecasting, satellite communications, medical research, crewless airplanes, and defenses against aircraft and missiles. Today, the SAB performs in-depth reviews of the Air Force Research Laboratory's science and technology research, and performs studies on topics tasked by the Secretary and Chief of Staff.  Members are appointed by the Secretary of Defense.

History
The board was established in 1944 under the name Scientific Advisory Group with General Henry H. Arnold as the military director and Dr. Theodore von Kármán as the board chair.  The group was asked to evaluate the aeronautical research and development programs and facilities of the Axis powers of World War II, and to provide recommendations for future United States Air Force research and development programs.
The group's name was changed to the Scientific Advisory Board in 1946.

SAB Chairs

Scientific Advisory Board Military Directors
1944–1946: Gen Henry Harley "Hap" Arnold
1946–47: Maj Gen Curtis E. Lemay
1947–1948: Lt Gen Laurence Craigie
1948–52,54- : Maj Gen Donald L. Putt

See also
 Scientific Advisory Group

Citations

United States Air Force
Military units and formations established in 1944
Think tanks based in the United States
American advisory organizations